is a city located in Niigata Prefecture, Japan. , the city had an estimated population of 41,333, and a population density of 55 persons per km2.

Geography
Itoigawa is located in the far southwestern corner of Niigata Prefecture, bordered by the Sea of Japan to the north, Nagano Prefecture to the south, and Toyama Prefecture to the west. Parts of the city are within the borders of the Chūbu-Sangaku National Park or the Myōkō-Togakushi Renzan National Park. Itoigawa is also famous for its jade which can be found on local beaches. Itoigawa also lends its name to the Itoigawa-Shizuoka Tectonic Line, a major fault that runs from Itoigawa, through Lake Suwa to the city of Shizuoka in Shizuoka Prefecture, forming the western border of the Fossa Magna.

Surrounding municipalities
Niigata Prefecture
Jōetsu
Myōkō
Nagano Prefecture
Otari
Hakuba
Toyama Prefecture
Asahi

Climate
Itoigawa has a Humid climate (Köppen Cfa) characterized by warm, wet summers and cold winters with heavy snowfall.

Demographics
Per Japanese census data, the population of Itoigawa has declined steadily over the past 70 years and is now less than it was a century ago.

History
The area of present-day Itoigawa was part of ancient Echigo Province. Historically, Itoigawa lies at the end of the shio no michi (salt road) that supplied salt from the Sea of Japan to Edo via Shinano Province. During the Edo period, Itoigawa was the castle town for Itoigawa Domain. After the Meiji restoration, with the establishment of the modern municipalities system on April 1, 1889, Itoigawa became a town within Nishikubiki District, Niigata.

The modern city was created on June 1, 1954 when the former town of Itoigawa absorbed the villages of Uramoto, Shimohayakawa, Kamihayakawa, Yamatogawa, Saikai, Ōno (Daino), Nechi and Kotati (Otaki) to elevate city status. On April 1, 2005, the towns of Nō and Ōmi (both from Nishikubiki District) were merged into Itoigawa.

Oldest known jadeite-using culture
A great many jadeite beads and axe heads as well as the remains of jadeite workshops from the Neolithic era have been uncovered in Itoigawa. These beads and axes were traded throughout Japan and the Korean Peninsula and were produced by the world's oldest known jadeite-using culture, centered on the Itoigawa region.

Government
Itoigawa has a mayor-council form of government with a directly elected mayor and a unicameral city legislature of 20 members. Itoigawa contributes one member to the Niigata Prefectural Assembly. In terms of national politics, the city is part of Niigata 6th district of the lower house of the Diet of Japan.

Economy
Commercial fishing and the production of limestone and cement are the mainstays of the local economy.

Education
Itoigawa has 14 public elementary schools and four public middle schools operated by the city government, and three public high schools operated by the Niigata Prefectural Bureau of Education. The city and  prefecture also operate one special education school each for the handicapped.

Transportation

Railway
 – Hokuriku Shinkansen
 
 JR West - Ōito Line
 -  -  -  -  - 
 Echigo Tokimeki Railway - Nihonkai Hisui Line
 -  -  - Itoigawa -  -  -  - 
 Ainokaze Toyama Railway

Highway
 Hokuriku Expressway – Oyashirazu IC, Itoigawa IC, Nō IC

Local attractions
 The entire territory of Itoigawa is "Itoigawa Global Geopark" which is a member of the Japanese Geoparks Network and Global Geoparks Network on account of its outstanding geological heritage, educational programs and projects, and promotion of geotourism.
The city is known for its distinctive black-colored yakisoba. 
 Itoigawa is also known for its unique bugaku, a variety of traditional Japanese performance art. Itoigawa Bugaku can be seen at festivals taking place at Hakusan Shrine and Amatsu Shrine, and has been nationally designated as an Important Intangible Cultural Asset.

National Historic Sites
Chōjagahara Site, Jōmon period archaeological site
Terachi Site, Jōmon period archaeological site 
Matsumoto Kaidō, ancient highway

Notable people from Itoigawa
 The poet Ryōkan (1758-1831) writes that Itoigawa is his former village.
 Hideki Hosaka, Japanese professional wrestler (known for his work in Frontier Martial-Arts Wrestling, All Japan Pro Wrestling, and Pro Wrestling Zero-One)

References

External links

Official Website 

 
Cities in Niigata Prefecture
Global Geoparks Network members
Geoparks in Japan
Populated coastal places in Japan